This is the order of battle for the Western Libya campaign, codenamed "Operation Flood of Dignity" by forces under Field Marshal Khalifa Haftar. The forces supporting Haftar and the House of Representatives, mainly the Libyan National Army, are opposed by the armed forces of the forces loyal to the Government of National Accord, including the Libyan Army and the Tripoli Protection Force.

Pro-House of Representatives forces
 House of Representatives
 Libyan National Army
9th Brigade (Kaniyat militia)
106th Brigade
Security Operations Room
Combatting Terrorism Unit
Madkhali forces
Tariq bin Ziyad Battalion
Subul Al-Salam militia
Al-Wadi Brigade
Tawhid Battalion
604th Infantry Battalion (since 6 January 2020)
 Libyan Navy 
 Libyan Air Force 
 Popular Front for the Liberation of Libya (PFLL)
Allied armed groups:
 Wagner Group
 Nukhba unit
 (per GNA)
United Arab Emirates Air Force

Pro-Government of National Accord forces
 Government of National Accord
 Libyan Ground Forces
4th Brigade
7th Kani (al-Kaniyat) Brigade
301rd Halboos Infantry Battalion
Ministry of Interior
Special Deterrence Force (SDF)
Tripoli Protection Force
Tripoli Revolutionaries Brigade
Nawasi Battalion (8th Force)
Abu Salim Joint Deterrence and Intervention Force
Bab Tajoura armed group
 Libyan Air Force 
 Libyan Navy 
Allied armed groups:
Misrata militias
Zawiya militias
Libya Shield Force 
Sirte militias
Sirte Protection and Security Force
604th Infantry Battalion (until 6 January 2020)
 Syrian National Army (since Dec. 2019)
 Sultan Murad Division
 Mu'tasim Division
 Suleyman Shah Division
 Sham Legion
 Ahrar al-Sharqiya
Northern Falcons Brigade (also known as Northern Hawks Brigade)
Suqour al-Sham Brigades
Samarkand Brigade
Al-Majd Corps
Hamza Division (Aleppo)
 Former al-Nusra Front fighters (LNA claim)
 (since Jan. 2020)
Turkish Armed Forces
 Turkish Land Forces
Turkish Navy
Turkish Air Force
Special Forces Command
National Intelligence Organization

References

Second Libyan Civil War
Orders of battle